Many anthology series made for television have been based on literary sources. These sources have gone back as far as Chaucer (The Canterbury Tales) and have included works by classic writers such as Edgar Allan Poe (The Black Cat from Masters of Horror) and Mark Twain (The Adventures of Huckleberry Finn from Climax!).

The Alfred Hitchcock Hour

Black Mirror

Bliss

The Canterbury Tales
Each story is an updated version of a story from Chaucer's The Canterbury Tales.

Climax!

Creepshow

The Hitchhiker

The Hunger

Masters of Horror

Masters of Science Fiction

Monsters

Night Gallery

Nightmare Classics

Nightmares and Dreamscapes: From the Stories of Stephen King
All episodes based on the short stories by Stephen King.

The Outer Limits

The Outer Limits (1964)

The Outer Limits (1995 - 2002)

The Ray Bradbury Theater
All stories by Ray Bradbury, many based on his short stories.

Tales from the Crypt
Mostly from EC Comics stories.  See List of Tales from the Crypt episodes.

Tales from the Darkside

Tales of the Unexpected
Early episodes based on Roald Dahl's short stories.

The United States Steel Hour

Lists of television series